John Stocker was an affluent merchant and insurance agent who lived on Front Street (Philadelphia) in Philadelphia during the 18th century. His house is preserved. He was an alderman and involved in the fire insurance business. His home is located at 404 Front Street. Francis Trumble's woodshop was also once located on the property.

References

Year of birth missing
Year of death missing
18th-century American people
Businesspeople in insurance
Businesspeople from Philadelphia